Federal elections were held in Switzerland on 31 October 1875. The Radical Left remained the largest group in the National Council.

Electoral system
The 135 members of the National Council were elected in 48 single- and multi-member constituencies using a three-round system. Candidates had to receive a majority in the first or second round to be elected; if it went to a third round, only a plurality was required. Voters could cast as many votes as there were seats in their constituency. There was one seat for every 20,000 citizens, with seats allocated to cantons in proportion to their population.

Results

National Council 
Voter turnout was highest in Aargau at 85.6% (higher than the 73.7% who voted in Schaffhausen, where voting was compulsory) and lowest in Zug at 31.4%.

By constituency

Council of States

References

1875
1875 elections in Europe
1875 in Switzerland